Dunira is a genus of moths of the family Erebidae. The genus was erected by Frederic Moore in 1885.

Species
Dunira calcara Holloway, 2005 Borneo
Dunira diplogramma (Hampson, 1912) Sri Lanka
Dunira fasciata Wileman & South, 1917 Japan
Dunira luna (Hampson, 1891) Nilgiri
Dunira lunapex Holloway, 2005 Borneo, Singapore
Dunira maculapes (Hampson, 1893) Sri Lanka
Dunira minoralis (Hampson, 1907) Sri Lanka
Dunira obliquilinea Hampson, 1926 Singapore, Peninsular Malaysia, Borneo, Bali, Andamans, Nicobars, Seram
Dunira pulchra (Bethune-Baker, 1908) New Guinea
Dunira punctimargo (Hampson, 1893) Sri Lanka, Taiwan
Dunira rectilineata (Hampson, 1896) Sri Lanka
Dunira rubripunctalis (Walker, [1859]) Sri Lanka, Peninsular Malaysia, Borneo, New Guinea, Queensland
Dunira scitula (Walker, 1865) Sri Lanka, Peninsular Malaysia, Borneo
Dunira subapicalis (C. Swinhoe, 1905) Assam

References

Boletobiinae
Noctuoidea genera